Dereliction of duty is a specific offense in military law.

Dereliction of Duty may also refer to:
 Dereliction of Duty (book), by H. R. McMaster, about the Vietnam War
 Dereliction of duty in meeting a legal duty of care